The 2008 BBL Champions Cup was the third edition of the super cup game in German basketball, and was played on September 19, 2007. The game was played at the Artland-Arena in Quakenbrück.

Match

References

BBL Champions Cup
Champions Cup